Andrea K. Brooks (born March 3, 1989) is a Canadian actress and model best known for portraying Faith Carter on the Hallmark series When Calls the Heart and Eve Teschmacher in The CW series Supergirl.

Early life
Born in Brantford, Ontario, Brooks trained in figure skating, dancing and musical theatre from an early age. At the age of fifteen, she auditioned for the Disney film Ice Princess. She lost out on the role, but gained an agent. She attended the University of British Columbia, where she gained a BA in English Literature and Film Studies and an MA in Film Studies. She also speaks fluent French.

Career
Having appeared in a variety of film and television productions, Brooks' major break came in 2015 when she was cast in the role of Nurse Faith Carter in the second season of Hallmark series When Calls the Heart. Her character received a mixed audience reception, due mainly to the threat she posed to the series central love story between Mountie Jack Thornton (Daniel Lissing) and teacher Elizabeth Thatcher (Erin Krakow). She continued as a series regular from season three. On June 17, 2022, the series was renewed for a tenth season.

In 2016, Brooks joined the cast of Supergirl when it was renewed for a second season. She originally auditioned for the role of Maggie Sawyer, although herself admitted that she did not feel that role was a "good fit". She was subsequently sent a further script to audition for the role of Janice. Having won the role, it was not until she received her first episode script that she discovered she would in fact be playing the role of Eve Teschmacher. She was promoted to the main cast for the series' fifth season.

In 2016 she appeared in the Hallmark television film A Wish for Christmas directed by Christie Will, whom Brooks had previously worked with in the 2006 short film Dysfunction.

Brooks played the lead role of Mandy Hamilton in the Hallmark original television film Destination Wedding, opposite Rafael Simon, which was broadcast in June 2017 as part of the channel's June Weddings series.

Personal life
On November 30, 2019, Brooks gave birth to her first child, a girl.
Her second child was born December 17, 2022.

Filmography

Film

Television

References

External links

 
 

1989 births
21st-century Canadian actresses
Actresses from Ontario
Canadian film actresses
Canadian television actresses
Living people
People from Brantford